Disavowal of Polytheists in Hajj (Arabic: االبراءة من المشركين في الحج, Persian:برائت از مشرکین در حج) is an Islamic religious/political tradition which is yearly performed at the time of Hajj. Disavowal of polytheists is a Qur'anic term or tradition which is applied to "disgust to polytheists and the enemies of Allah/His apostle".; it likewise means: "Announcement of Bara'ah (disgust/aversion) from all Taghuts and arrogance powers".

Aversion to idolaters or disavowal of polytheists in Hajj is recently followed more diligence from the political angle, and is carried out by Muslims --Hajjis—as an opportunity to confront the plans of arrogance. The history of this Quranic tradition is considered from the time of Khalilullah (Abraham) to the Islamic prophet Muhammad. In the current years, it has also been paid heeded seriously by religious/political leaders, such as Seyyed Ruhollah Khomeini and Seyyed Ali Khamenei.

Current era
The revival of this Islamic custom and its basics explanation in the recent era are come back to the suggestion of the first supreme leader of Iran, Ruhollah Khomeini who named two doctrines of "Tawalla and Tabarra" as the main base of this Islamic expression.

In explaining the philosophy of Bara'at (Disavowal), Khomeini mentions that: the great/mean/little (first, middle and back) devils must be repulsed from the holy privacy of Islam. He also added in regards to the issue of "Bara'ah Min al-Mushrikin" (disavowal of polytheists) in Hajj":

After passing away of the first supreme leader of Iran Seyyed Ruhollah Khomeini, the current supreme leader of Iran Seyyed Ali Khamenei issues message(s) annually on the ritual of "disavowal of polytheists" to Hajj pilgrims. He mentioned in his last message on August 6, 2019, that: "The ritual of Bara’ah which means refusing every instance of mercilessness, cruelty, wrongdoing and corruption of the tyrants of any time, and rising against intimidation and extortion by the arrogant throughout history, is one of the great blessings of Hajj, and an opportunity for oppressed Muslim nations. Today, repudiating the front of shirk [polytheism] and kufr [disbelief] made up of the arrogant powers—the foremost of them being the U.S.—equals refusing the killing of the oppressed, and waging wars..."

In Quran

The most attention of the Quran in regards to the subject of Bara'ah is concerning the communication of "Bara'ah Min al-Mushrikin" (disavowal of polytheists) at the time of the Islamic prophet Muhammad during the season of Hajj in 9th lunar year, and also aversion of Abraham from Mushrikins (polytheists). In the meanwhile, being numerous ayahs in the Quran and removing the idols from Kaaba by Muhammad during the history of Islam portrays the importance of this tradition from Islamic aspect.

The issue of "disavowal of polytheists" which is considered as an/the essential political of Hajj, has been mentioned in Surahs/Ayahs of Quran, such as: in Surah Al-Mumtahanah, Surah Al-Fath, Surah Al-Ma'ida. Even there is a Surah by that name too, namely Surah Bara'ah (At-Tawba). According to the announcement of Bara'ah, it was banned for the polytheists to enter Masjid al-Haram, and to perform Hajj.

See also
 1987 Mecca incident
 Al Wala' Wal Bara'
 At-Tawba
 Glossary of Islam
 Hajj and Pilgrimage Organization (Iran)
 Tawalla & Tabarra

References

Hajj
Islamic terminology
Jihad
Quran